Lunaria telekiana is a rare and poorly known species known from Albania, Montenegro, and Kosovo. It has been proposed for protection under international treaties on endangered species.

References

External links
Czech Botany, Lunaria telekiana 
Colnect, photo of Albanian postage stamp bearing color depiction of Lunaria telekiana

Brassicaceae
Flora of Kosovo
Flora of Serbia
Flora of Montenegro
Flora of Albania
Endangered plants
Plants described in 1920